The HPCG (high performance conjugate gradient) benchmark is a supercomputing benchmark test proposed by Michael Heroux from Sandia National Laboratories, and Jack Dongarra and Piotr Luszczek from the University of Tennessee. It is intended to model the data access patterns of real-world applications such as sparse matrix calculations, thus testing the effect of limitations of the memory subsystem and internal interconnect of the supercomputer on its computing performance. Because it is internally I/O bound (the data for the benchmark resides in main memory as it is too large for processor caches), HPCG testing generally achieves only a tiny fraction of the peak FLOPS the computer could theoretically deliver.

HPCG is intended to complement benchmarks such as the LINPACK benchmarks that put relatively little stress on the internal interconnect. The source of the HPCG benchmark is available on GitHub.

As of June 2018, the Summit supercomputer held the top spot in the HPCG performance rankings, followed by the Sierra and the K computer. 

In June of 2020, Summit was superseded by Fugaku, which as of November 2022, with a speed of 16.0 HPCG-petaflops, an increase of 540% over Summit, now 4rd and Frontier 2nd (1st on Top500)  closely following and LUMI 3rd.

See also 
 Graph500
 Memory access pattern
 Traversed edges per second
 Preconditioned conjugate gradient method

References

External links 
 HPCG Benchmark
 source code

Parallel computing
Supercomputer benchmarks
Benchmarks (computing)